Carychium mariae is a species of minute air-breathing land snail, a terrestrial pulmonate gastropod mollusk in the family Ellobiidae.

Carychium mariae was described by Italian malacologist Marianna Panciatichi Ximenes d’Aragona Paulucci (1835-1919) in 1878.

Distribution 
This species occurs in European countries and islands including:
 France
 Italy
 Slovenia
 Croatia

References

External links 
 http://www.animalbase.uni-goettingen.de/zooweb/servlet/AnimalBase/home/species?id=1830
 fauna-eu.org
 Weigand A. M., Götze M.-C. & Jochum A. (2012) "Outdated but established?! Conchologically driven species delineations in microgastropods (Carychiidae, Carychium)". Organisms Diversity & Evolution DOI:10.1007/s13127-011-0070-2.

Ellobiidae
Gastropods described in 1878